Brazil competed in the 2019 Parapan American Games from 23 August to 1 September.

Medalists

Athletics

Badminton

Boccia

Cycling

Football 5-a-side

Football 7-a-side

Goalball

Judo

Powerlifting

Shooting

There will be eight sports shooters participating.

Sitting volleyball

Swimming

Table tennis

Taekwondo

Wheelchair basketball

Wheelchair rugby

Wheelchair tennis

See also
Brazil at the 2019 Pan American Games

References

2019 in Brazilian sport
Nations at the 2019 Parapan American Games
Brazil at the Parapan American Games